Washington Initiative 1185 was a 2012 initiative in Washington state. It passed with 63.91% of the vote, but portions were declared unconstitutional in February 2013.

Ballot measure title and summary 
The full text of the measure is available online. As described by the Secretary of State's office, I-1185  "concerns tax and fee increases imposed by state government."

Support and opposition
Statements for and against each ballot measure are also available online as part of the official online voter's guide. As per RCW 42.17A on "campaign disclosure and contribution," the Washington State Public Disclosure Commission also posts campaign information online, including information for referendums and initiatives

The primary sponsor registered for I-1185 was Tim Eyman, who proposed 25 initiatives for 2012. Additional sponsors were Leo J. Fagan and M.J. Fagan. Approximately 95% of the money to support the initiative was reportedly from "corporate behemoths such as oil companies ... the national beer and soda-pop industries and big pharmaceutical firms."

References

Taxation in Washington (state)
2012 Washington (state) ballot measures
Washington (state) law
Initiatives in the United States